Deniz Hümmet (born 13 September 1996) is a Turkish professional footballer who plays as a forward for TFF First League club Çaykur Rizespor.

Career
Hümmet made his Ligue 2 debut on 13 February 2015. He made his Ligue 1 debut on 20 February 2016 against AS Monaco.

International career
Hümmet was called up to the Turkish U21 team, in a friendly game against Germany in Berlin in November 2016.

References

External links
 
 
 
 

1996 births
Living people
Turkish footballers
Turkish expatriate footballers
Turkey youth international footballers
Swedish footballers
Swedish people of Turkish descent
ES Troyes AC players
Gefle IF players
Trelleborgs FF players
IF Elfsborg players
Örebro SK players
Ligue 2 players
Association football forwards
Ligue 1 players
Superettan players
Allsvenskan players
Expatriate footballers in France
People from Malmö Municipality
Footballers from Skåne County